Greece competed at the 2013 World Aquatics Championships in Barcelona, Spain between 19 July and 4 August 2013.

Medalists

Diving

Greece nominated two athletes to participate.

Men

Open water swimming

Greece nominated four athletes (two men and two women) to participate.

Swimming

Greek swimmers earned qualifying standards in the following events (up to a maximum of 2 swimmers in each event at the A-standard entry time, and 1 at the B-standard):

Men

Women

Synchronized swimming

Greece has qualified thirteen synchronized swimmers.

* Reserves

Water polo

Men's tournament

Team roster
The following is the Greek roster in the men's water polo tournament of the 2013 World Aquatic championships.

Head coach: Sakis Kechagias

Group play

Round of 16

Quarterfinal

5th–8th place semifinal

Fifth place game

Women's tournament

Team roster

Eleni Kouvdou
Christina Tsoukala
Vasiliki Diamantopoulou
Ilektra Psouni
Margarita Plevritou
Alkisti Avramidou
Alexandra Asimaki
Antigoni Roumpesi
Christina Kotsia
Triantafyllia Manolioudaki
Eleftheria Plevritou
Alkistis Benekou
Chrysoula Diamantopoulou

Group play

Round of 16

Quarterfinal

5th–8th place semifinal

Fifth place game

References

External links
Barcelona 2013 Official Site
KOE (Hellenic Swimming Federation) 

Nations at the 2013 World Aquatics Championships
2013 in Greek sport
Greece at the World Aquatics Championships